Fotuhabad (also Romanized as Fotūḩābād; also known as Fotūhābād-e Korbāl and Fotuh Abad Korbal) is a village in Rahmatabad Rural District, Zarqan District, Shiraz County, Fars Province, Iran. At the 2006 census, its population was 237, in 64 families.

References 

Populated places in Zarqan County